Sincoraea navioides is a species of flowering plant in the family Bromeliaceae, native to Brazil (the state of Bahia). It was first described by Lyman Bradford Smith in 1940 as Cryptanthopsis navioides.

References

Bromelioideae
Flora of Brazil
Plants described in 1940